Genocide is the intentional destruction of an ethnic, national, racial, or religious group.

Genocide may also refer to:

History
 Convention on the Prevention and Punishment of the Crime of Genocide, 1948 UN treaty legally defining the crime of genocide
 Genocides in history
 List of genocides by death toll

Fictional characters
 Toko Fukawa, a serial killer in the Danganronpa series known interchangeably as "Genocide Jill", "Genocide Jack", and "Genocider Syo"
 Genocide (comics), a female golem and supervillain owned by DC Comics

Film and literature
 Genocide (1968 film), a 1968 Japanese film
 Genocide (1981 film), a 1981 documentary film
 Genocide (novel), a 1997 Doctor Who novel by Paul Leonard
 "Genocide" (The World at War episode)
 The Genocides, a 1965 novel by Thomas M. Disch
 Genocider Mode, a 2015 Japanese manga series written and illustrated by Machika Minami and Touya Hajime

Music
 Genocide (album), an album by Judas Priest
 Genocide, an EP by Upon a Burning Body
 "Genocide", a song by Deathstars from the album Synthetic Generation
 "Genocide", a song by Hammerfall from the album Threshold
 "Genocide", a song by Judas Priest from the album Sad Wings of Destiny
 "Genocide", a song by The Offspring from the album Smash
 "Genocide", a song by Psyclon Nine from the album Divine Infekt
 "Genocide", a song by Suicide Silence from the album No Time to Bleed
 "Genocide (The Killing of the Buffalo)", a song by Thin Lizzy from the album Chinatown
 "Genocide Initiative", a song by Carnifex from the album Hell Chose Me
 "Genocide", a song by dj Killer released for the music video game Beatmania IIDX 11 IIDXRED
 Genocide Organ, a German power electronics collective

Games
 Genocide (1989 video game), series of Japan-exclusive video games
 Genocide (MUD), a 1992 MUD focused on player-versus-player conflict
 Genocide route, a run in Undertale where the protagonist intentionally kills all monsters encountered

See also
 Gendercide, the systematic killing of members of a specific sex